Villana Santiago Pacheco (born March 27, 1995), known professionally as Villano Antillano, is a Puerto Rican rapper. She gained recognition in 2022 with the release of "Bzrp Music Sessions, Vol. 51" alongside producer Bizarrap.

Early life
Antillano was born on March 27, 1995, in Bayamón, Puerto Rico. From an early stage, Antillano had an interest in music, one of her first musical inspirations being Rubén Blades.

Career
Antillano started her career in 2019 with her extended play Tiranía, which treats themes like prejudice against LGBT people.

Personal life
Antillano identifies as a transfemme non-binary person. Antillano uses she/her and they/them pronouns. She is a transfeminist.

Discography

Albums
 La Sustancia X (2022)

Extended plays
 Tiranía (2019)
 Ketaprincesa (2020)
 Hembrismo  (2022)

Singles

Notes

References

1995 births
20th-century Puerto Rican LGBT people
21st-century Puerto Rican LGBT people
LGBT people in Latin music
Living people
Puerto Rican rappers
People from Bayamón, Puerto Rico
Puerto Rican LGBT singers
LGBT rappers
Transgender singers
Transgender non-binary people
Non-binary singers